Philipp Petzschner and Alexander Peya won in the final 6–2, 3–6, [10–4], against James Auckland and Joshua Goodall.

Seeds

Draw

Draw

References
 Doubles Draw

Doubles